Roberts Slotiņš (born 21 July 1991) is a Latvian cross country skier who represented Latvia at the 2022 Winter Olympics. He trains out of Mazsalaca.

References

External links

Living people
1991 births
Latvian male cross-country skiers
Latvian male biathletes
People from Cēsis
Cross-country skiers at the 2022 Winter Olympics
Olympic cross-country skiers of Latvia